The Turkish Lake District or Turkish Lakeland is an area with a series of shallow tectonic lakes within the folds of the Taurus Mountains in Southwestern Anatolia, Turkey

The major lakes are Acıgöl (Sanaos), Akşehir (Philomela), Beyşehir (Koralis), Burdur (Ascanius), Eğirdir (Akrotiri), and the smaller ones are Akgöl, Lake Çavuşçu (Ilgın), Eber, Işıklı (Çivril), Karamık, Karataş, Kovada, Salda (Aulindenos), Suğla (Trogitis) and Yarışlı.

References

Lakes of Turkey
Regions of Turkey
Natural history of Anatolia